Ronald Williams (born January 19, 1966) is a former American professional football player who was a tight end in the National Football League (NFL) and the World League of American Football (WLAF). He played for the Miami Dolphins and Seattle Seahawks of the NFL, and the San Antonio Riders of the WLAF. Williams played collegiately at Oklahoma State University.

References

1966 births
Living people
American football quarterbacks
American football tight ends
American football wide receivers
Miami Dolphins players
Oklahoma State Cowboys football players
People from Wichita Falls, Texas
Players of American football from Texas
San Antonio Riders players
Seattle Seahawks players